Wuhu Wanli Airport , often called Wuhu Air Base, is a Chinese People's Liberation Army Air Force (PLAAF) air base in Wuhu, Anhui Province, China.

History
Wuhu Airbase was originally constructed in 1934 in response to Imperial Japanese aggressions and ambitions in the mainland of China, and was a staging location for the Republic-era Chinese Air Force to launch air strikes and combat air patrols against Japanese incursions and positions during first battles of World War II in Asia; the Battle of Shanghai, Battle of Taiyuan and the Battle of Nanjing.

Operations 
In 2019, the base prepared for the 9th Fighter Brigade's adoption of the Chengdu J-20 stealth fighter, constructing 26 new hangars. Wuhu Air Base also hosts PLAAF's No. 5720 factory.

See also
Wuhu Xuanzhou Airport (nearby commercial airfield)
List of People's Liberation Army Air Force airbases

References

Airports in Anhui
Chinese Air Force bases
Defunct airports in China
Buildings and structures in Wuhu